Elections to Belfast City Council were held on 5 May 2005 on the same day as the other Northern Irish local government elections. The election used nine district electoral areas to elect a total of 51 councillors, most representing the more heavily populated north and west.

The DUP emerged as the largest party, and Wallace Browne became Lord Mayor.

Election results

Note: "Votes" are the first preference votes.

Districts summary

|- class="unsortable" align="centre"
!rowspan=2 align="left"|Ward
! % 
!Cllrs
! %
!Cllrs
! %
!Cllrs
! %
!Cllrs
! %
!Cllrs
! %
!Cllrs
! %
!Cllrs
!rowspan=2|TotalCllrs
|- class="unsortable" align="center"
!colspan=2 bgcolor="" | DUP
!colspan=2 bgcolor="" | Sinn Féin
!colspan=2 bgcolor=""| SDLP
!colspan=2 bgcolor="" | UUP
!colspan=2 bgcolor="" | Alliance
!colspan=2 bgcolor="" | PUP
!colspan=2 bgcolor="white"| Others
|-
|align="left"|Balmoral
|22.2
|2
|10.3
|0
|bgcolor="#99FF66"|33.1
|bgcolor="#99FF66"|2
|19.7
|1
|12.9
|1
|0.0
|0
|1.8
|0
|6
|-
|align="left"|Castle
|bgcolor="#D46A4C"|38.6
|bgcolor="#D46A4C"|2
|18.6
|1
|27.1
|2
|10.5
|1
|2.5
|0
|0.0
|0
|2.7
|0
|6
|-
|align="left"|Court
|bgcolor="#D46A4C"|67.7
|bgcolor="#D46A4C"|3
|3.3
|0
|0.0
|0
|7.7
|0
|0.0
|0
|10.7
|1
|13.9
|1
|5
|-
|align="left"|Laganbank
|15.1
|1
|17.8
|1
|bgcolor="#99FF66"|31.5
|bgcolor="#99FF66"|2
|18.8
|1
|9.5
|0
|0.0
|0
|7.2
|0
|5
|-
|align="left"|Lower Falls
|0.0
|0
|bgcolor="#008800"|85.2
|bgcolor="#008800"|5
|11.9
|0
|0.0
|0
|0.0
|0
|0.0
|0
|3.5
|0
|5
|-
|align="left"|Oldpark
|22.3
|1
|bgcolor="#008800"|47.5
|bgcolor="#008800"|3
|15.9
|1
|7.9
|1
|0.0
|0
|3.8
|0
|3.2
|0
|6
|-
|align="left"|Pottinger
|bgcolor="#D46A4C"|41.7
|bgcolor="#D46A4C"|3
|8.9
|0
|6.3
|0
|22.0
|1
|7.5
|1
|11.0
|1
|2.5
|1
|6
|-
|align="left"|Upper Falls
|0.0
|0
|bgcolor="#008800"|75.2
|bgcolor="#008800"|4
|24.8
|1
|0.0
|0
|0.0
|0
|0.0
|0
|0.0
|0
|5
|-
|align="left"|Victoria
|bgcolor="#D46A4C"|37.5
|bgcolor="#D46A4C"|3
|0.0
|0
|2.4
|0
|33.0
|2
|23.4
|2
|2.1
|0
|1.7
|0
|7
|- class="unsortable" class="sortbottom" style="background:#C9C9C9"
|align="left"| Total
|25.8
|15
|30.6
|14
|17.1
|8
|13.8
|7
|6.8
|4
|2.7
|2
|3.2
|1
|51
|-
|}

District results

Balmoral

2001: 2 x UUP, 2 x SDLP, 1 x Alliance, 1 x DUP
2005: 2 x SDLP, 1 x DUP, 1 x UUP, 1 x Alliance
2001-2005 Change: DUP gain from UUP

Castle

2001: 2 x DUP, 2 x SDLP, 1 x Sinn Féin, 1 x UUP
2005: 2 x DUP, 2 x SDLP, 1 x Sinn Féin, 1 x UUP
2001-2005 Change: No change

Court

2001: 2 x DUP, 1 x UUP, 1 x PUP, 1 x Independent
2005: 3 x DUP, 1 x PUP, 1 x Independent
2001-2005 Change: DUP gain from UUP

Laganbank

2001: 2 x SDLP, 2 x UUP, 1 x Sinn Féin, 
2005: 2 x SDLP, 1 x UUP, 1 x Sinn Féin, 1 x DUP
2001-2005 Change: DUP gain from UUP

Lower Falls

2001: 4 x Sinn Féin, 1 x SDLP
2005: 5 x Sinn Féin
2001-2005 Change: Sinn Féin gain from SDLP

Oldpark

2001: 3 x Sinn Féin, 1 x SDLP, 1 x DUP, 1 x PUP
2005: 3 x Sinn Féin, 1 x DUP, 1 x SDLP, 1 x UUP
2001-2005 Change: UUP gain from PUP

Pottinger

2001: 3 x DUP, 1 x UUP, 1 x PUP, 1 x Alliance
2005: 2 x DUP, 2 x UUP, 1 x PUP, 1 x Sinn Féin
2001-2005 Change: DUP and Alliance gain from UUP and Sinn Féin

Upper Falls

2001: 4 x Sinn Féin, 1 x SDLP
2005: 4 x Sinn Féin, 1 x SDLP
2001-2005 Change: No change

Victoria

2001: 3 x UUP, 2 x DUP, 2 x Alliance
2005: 3 x DUP, 2 x UUP, 2 x Alliance
2001-2005 Change: DUP gain from UUP

References

2005
2005 Northern Ireland local elections
21st century in Belfast
2005 elections in Northern Ireland